George Foster Shepley  (1860–1903) was an American architect. He was the senior partner in the firm of Shepley, Rutan & Coolidge of Boston and Chicago, the successor to the firm of architect Henry Hobson Richardson.

Life and career
George Foster Shepley was born on November 7, 1860 in St Louis, Missouri to John Rutledge Shepley, a lawyer, and Mary Augusta (Clapp) Shepley. Senator Ether Shepley of Maine was his grandfather. He received his BA from Washington University in St. Louis in 1880 and graduated from the Massachusetts Institute of Technology in 1882. Shepley worked briefly for the Boston firm of Ware & Van Brunt before joining the Brookline studio of Henry Hobson Richardson. Shepley had worked for Richardson for about four years when he died in April of 1886. Shepley and two other senior employees, Charles Hercules Rutan and Charles Allerton Coolidge, then took charge of the studio and its uncompleted work. In June of 1886 the three formed a formal partnership, Shepley, Rutan & Coolidge, to succeed to Richardson's practice, and in 1887 moved the office to Boston.

Shepley was senior partner of the firm until his death in 1903. During his lifetime, the firm completed many major works, including the Inner Quad (1891) of Stanford University in California, the Ames Building (1893) and South Station (1899) in Boston, the Art Institute of Chicago (1893) and Chicago Cultural Center (1897) in Chicago and the Guardian Bank Building (1896) in Cleveland. At the time of his death he was at work on designs for the new campus of the Harvard Medical School.

Shepley was a member of the Boston Society of Architects and joined the American Institute of Architects in 1889 as a Fellow. He was also a member of the Somerset Club and the Tavern Club.

Legacy and personal life
Shepley is credited for redirecting the firm's stylistic output from the idiosyncratic Richardsonian Romanesque style to the Classical architecture of the Beaux-Arts movement.

In 1886 Shepley was married to Julia Hayden Richardson, daughter of H. H. Richardson. The marriage took place about two months after her father's death. Together the couple had five children, including three sons and two daughters. Their eldest child, Henry Richardson Shepley (1887–1962), was also an architect. He joined Shepley, Rutan & Coolidge in 1914 and became a partner in its successor firm, Coolidge, Shepley, Bulfinch & Abbott, in 1924. Hugh Shepley (1928–2017), son of Henry R. Shepley, was also later a partner in the firm.

Shepley died July 17, 1903 in St. Moritz, Switzerland, where he had traveled for health-related reasons.

See also
 Shepley Bulfinch
 Shepley, Rutan and Coolidge

References

Architects from St. Louis
Architects from Boston
19th-century American architects
1860 births
1903 deaths
Massachusetts Institute of Technology alumni
Fellows of the American Institute of Architects
Sam Fox School of Design & Visual Arts alumni